Joni Cotten (born May 21, 1953, in North Chicago, Illinois) is an American curler from Mount Prospect, Illinois.

Curling career 
In 1997 Cotten won the United States Women's Championship while playing second for Patti Lank. As national champions they represented the United States at the 1997 World Women's Championship, finishing 7th. Cotten again won the US Championship in 2000, this time playing second for Amy Wright. At the 2000 World Championship the US women tied for 6th place with Germany and Denmark.

At the 2001 World Championship Cotten played as alternate with skip Kari Erickson, Debbie McCormick, Stacey Liapis, and Ann Swisshelm. The team finished 6th. Cotten continued to play alternate for team Erickson as they won the 2001 United States Olympic Trials and competed as Team USA at the 2002 Winter Olympics in Salt Lake City. At the Olympics they finished 4th, losing to Team Switzerland in the semifinals and Team Canada in the bronze medal match.

Cotten played in her 4th World Championship in 2003, as alternate for skip Debbie McCormick. The team finished round robin play tied for 3rd place with a record of 5–4. They then defeated Team Sweden in the semifinals and Team Canada in the finals to win the gold medal.

In 2012 Cotten returned to international competition, as alternate for the senior women's team skipped by Pam Oleinik. The team won the United States Senior Women's Championship and placed 5th at the World Senior Championship.

Personal life 
Cotten is married and has two children.

Teams

References

External links 
 

1953 births
Living people
People from North Chicago, Illinois
People from Mount Prospect, Illinois
American female curlers
Olympic curlers of the United States
Curlers at the 2002 Winter Olympics
World curling champions
American curling champions
21st-century American women